Idu or IDU may refer to:
 Indoor unit of an Australian National Broadband Network fixed wireless connection, see NTD (NBN)
International Democrat Union, an international alliance of political parties
Idu, Iran, a village in Razavi Khorasan Province, Iran
 Idu, Abuja, a neighbourhood of Abuja, Nigeria
Idu script, archaic writing system that represents the Korean language using hanja
Idu Mishmi language, the language of the Idu Mishmi people
Hongcheon Idu FC, South Korean football club
 Injecting drug user, see Drug injection
 Idu G7102, an official during the Sixth Dynasty of Egypt, buried in tomb G7102 of the Giza East Field
 Idu (novel), a 1970 novel by Flora Nwapa

See also
 Idu Mishmi (disambiguation)